Betula neoalaskana (syn. B. resinifera) or Alaska birch, also known as Alaska paper birch or resin birch, is a species of birch native to Alaska and northern Canada. Its range covers most of interior Alaska, and extends from the southern Brooks Range to the Chugach Range in Alaska, including the Turnagain Arm and northern half of the Kenai Peninsula, eastward from Norton Sound through the Yukon, Northwest Territories, British Columbia, Alberta, Saskatchewan, Manitoba, southern Nunavut, and into northwestern Ontario.

The mature bark ranges widely in color, from pure white to red, yellowish, pinkish, or gray. Bark of twigs, seedlings, and saplings is dark, from reddish to almost black, and covered with resin glands.

Although it is diploid like its close relatives, the Eurasian Silver Birch and the eastern American Gray Birch, it frequently hybridizes with the hexaploid Paper Birch; the hybrid is known as Betula × winteri. Hybrids also occur with American Dwarf Birch, named Betula × uliginosa.

See also
Birch syrup

References
Flora of North America: Betula neoalaskana
Packee, E. C. (2004). Taxonomy and Evolution of Alaska's Birches. Agroborealis 36(1): 20.
Hunt, D. (1993). Betula. Proceedings of the IDS Betula Symposium 2–4 October 1992. International Dendrology Society.
Integrated Taxonomic Information System - Itis.gov  Betula neoalaskana

neoalaskana
Trees of Subarctic America
Flora of Northern Canada
Trees of Western Canada
Trees of Eastern Canada
Flora of Alaska
Trees of continental subarctic climate
Trees of Alaska
Flora without expected TNC conservation status